Margaret Ross may refer to:
 Margaret Clunies Ross (born 1942), Australian academic
 Margaret Ross (academic), professor of software quality  at Southampton Solent University
 Margaret Ross (Paralympian), Australian Paralympian